Tengiz Lake (Teñız kölı) is a saline lake in Korgalzhyn District, Akmola Region, Kazakhstan. 

On 16 October 1976, the Soviet spacecraft Soyuz 23 unintentionally splashed down into the northern part of the lake, which was frozen, crashing through the ice. The crew was saved thanks to a very difficult but successful rescue operation.

Geography
Tengiz is a shallow lake, subject to seasonal variations in water level. Its eastern shore is deeply indented and includes the Tengizi Islands. The lake is located in an intermontane basin of the Kazakh Uplands and is the largest of the area. 

The Nura and Kulanotpes are the main rivers flowing into the lake. Lake Korgalzhyn is located in the eastern part, and Kypshak and Kerey to the southwest of lake Tengiz.

Ecology
The lake Tengiz area is an important wetland site for birds. It is a part of a Ramsar wetland site of international importance, the Tengiz-Korgalzhyn Lake System, where 318 species of birds have been recorded, 22 of which are endangered. Neighboring lake Korgalzhyn is the most northerly nesting site for the Greater flamingo; in the years 2006-2011 around 45,000 members of that species were noted. In 2015, however, the number dropped to less than 15,000. The lake is part of the Korgalzhyn Nature Reserve, for which it was nominated in 2008 together with the Naurzum Nature Reserve as the first natural UNESCO World Heritage Site in Kazakhstan (Saryarka — Steppe and Lakes of Northern Kazakhstan).

References

External links

Lakes of Kazakhstan
Ramsar sites in Kazakhstan
Saline lakes of Asia
Kazakh Uplands
Akmola Region